The term omocha, a romanization of the Japanese word for "toy", may refer to the following:

Places
Omocha-no-Machi Station

Fiction

1900s
The younger sister portrayed by Isuzu Yamada in 1936 film Sisters of the Gion
Kodomo no Omocha, a 1994 manga series
Kirby no Omocha Hako, 1996 video game series
The Geisha House, a 1998 film

2000s
Lotte no Omocha!, a 2007 manga series
Omocha no Kuni de Daikessen da Koron!, a 2009 film
Eiga Furesshu Purikyua! Omocha no Kuni wa Himitsu ga Ippai!?, a 2009 film
Astarotte no Omocha!, a 2011 anime adaptation of Lotte